William Page Wood, 1st Baron Hatherley, PC (29 November 1801 – 10 July 1881) was a British lawyer and statesman who served as a Liberal Lord High Chancellor of Great Britain between 1868 and 1872 in William Ewart Gladstone's first ministry.

Background and education
Wood was born in London, the second son of Sir Matthew Wood, 1st Baronet, an alderman and Lord Mayor of London who became famous for befriending Queen Caroline and braving George IV. Sir Evelyn Wood and Katharine O'Shea were his nephew and niece respectively.

He was educated at Winchester College, from which he was expelled after a revolt against the headmaster, Woodbridge School, Geneva University, and Trinity College, Cambridge, where he became a fellow after being 24th wrangler in 1824.

Legal and political career
Wood entered Lincoln's Inn, and was called to the Bar in 1824, studying conveyancing in John Tyrrell's chambers. He soon obtained a good practice as an equity draughtsman and before parliamentary committees. In 1845 he became a Queen's Counsel, and in 1847 was elected to parliament for the city of Oxford as a Liberal. In 1849 he was appointed Vice-Chancellor of the County Palatine of Lancaster, and in 1851 was made Solicitor General for England and Wales and knighted, vacating the former position in 1852. When his party returned to power in 1853, he was raised to the bench as a Vice-Chancellor.

In 1868 he was made a Lord Justice of Appeal, but before the end of the year was selected by Gladstone to be Lord High Chancellor of Great Britain and was raised to the peerage as Baron Hatherley, of Down Hatherley in the County of Gloucester. He retired in 1872 owing to failing eyesight, but sat occasionally as a law lord.

Family
Wood married Charlotte, daughter of Edward Moor, in 1830. They had no children. Charlotte's death in 1878 was a great blow to Wood, from which he never recovered, and he died in London on 10 July 1881, aged 79. Both are buried in the churchyard in Great Bealings, Suffolk, where Charlotte's brother was rector.  The title became extinct on his death.

Arms

See also
Page Wood Baronets
Pilcher v Rawlins

References

External links

 
 

Hatherley, William Wood, 1st Baron
Members of the Judicial Committee of the Privy Council
Hatherley, William Wood, 1st Baron
Wood, William Wood, 1st Baron Hatherley
Wood, William Wood, 1st Baron Hatherley
Hatherley, William Wood, 1st Baron
Hatherley, William Wood, 1st Baron
UK MPs 1852–1857
UK MPs who were granted peerages
Younger sons of baronets
Solicitors General for England and Wales
People educated at Winchester College
Fellows of the Royal Society
Members of the Privy Council of the United Kingdom
Peers of the United Kingdom created by Queen Victoria